Specklinia corniculata is a species of plant native to Belize, Colombia, Costa Rica, Cuba, French Guiana, Guatemala, Guyana, Haiti, Honduras, Nicaragua, Panama, Suriname, and Venezuela.

References 

corniculata
Orchids of Central America
Orchids of Belize
Flora of Belize
Flora of Colombia
Flora of Costa Rica
Flora of Cuba
Flora of French Guiana
Flora of Guatemala
Flora of Guyana
Flora of Haiti
Flora of Honduras
Flora of Nicaragua
Flora of Panama
Flora of Suriname
Flora of Venezuela
Flora without expected TNC conservation status